Mihhail Lotman (born September 2, 1952 in Leningrad) is an Estonian literature researcher and politician, son of Juri Lotman and Zara Mints.

Mihhail Lotman's research fields include general semiotics and semiotics of culture as well as text theory and history of Russian literature. Lotman was a member of the board of Russian Cultural Society in Estonia from 1988 to 1994. Lotman is a professor of semiotics and literary theory at the Tallinn University and also a member of a research group on semiotics at the University of Tartu.

Lotman was awarded the Medal of the Order of the White Star on February 2, 2001. In recent years, Lotman has been active in politics, serving as Member of Riigikogu for the conservative Res Publica Party.

In 2010, Lotman defended Sofi Oksanen's novel Puhdistus against its opponents in Estonia.

References

External links

Mihhail Lotman's homepage 
University of Tartu page
Estonian Research Portal entry
List of publications

Estonian scholars
Linguists from Estonia
Estonian people of Russian descent
Estonian Jews
Russian Jews
1952 births
Living people
Recipients of the Order of the White Star, Medal Class
Academic staff of the University of Tartu
University of Tartu alumni
Estonian semioticians
Members of the Riigikogu, 2003–2007
Members of the Riigikogu, 2019–2023
Academic staff of Tallinn University
Russians in Estonia
Recipients of the Order of the White Star, 2nd Class